Paraskevas is a Greek surname. It is the surname of:

 Apostolos Paraskevas, Greek composer and guitarist.
 Betty Paraskevas (1929–2010), American lyricist.
 Michael Paraskevas (born 1961), American illustrator.
 Janet Paraskeva (born 1946), British government official.
 Michalis Paraskevas (born 1976), a Cypriot lawyer and social activist.

See also
 Paraskevas (given name), Greek given name.
 Paraskevopoulos, Greek surname ("son of Paraskevas")

Greek-language surnames
Surnames